Shasta McNasty (later retitled Shasta) is an American sitcom that aired on UPN from October 5, 1999, to August 1, 2000. The show was created by Jeff Eastin and produced by Eastin and Neal H. Moritz. The show starred Carmine Giovinazzo, Jake Busey, Dale Godboldo, and Jolie Jenkins.

Although Shasta McNasty premiered with less-than-favorable reviews from critics, the program was nominated for a People's Choice Award for best new comedy, and nearly winning it in a live online vote before eventually losing to Stark Raving Mad. However, the series was cancelled after one season.

Plotline
Shasta McNasty focused on three friends—Scott, Dennis and Randy—who are part of the rap rock band Shasta McNasty. After signing to Da Funk Records, the three friends relocate from Chicago to LA where they find out that the label has become defunct. Keeping their advance money that they'd been given, they rent an apartment in Venice Beach where they share a kitchen with their next door neighbor Diana. The first half of the series focused on the band, their landlord, odd jobbing to make rent and generally getting up to mischief, while the second half of the season focused on them working at the local bar for their friend Vern, hoping to get signed by a label again and the developing relationship between Scott and Diana.

The series' concluding episode is set ten years later, and is presented as an episode of "Behind the Band 2010" (a parody of Behind the Music). It is revealed that Shasta McNasty did become a famous, highly successful band; nevertheless, ego, addiction, in-fighting, and creative differences took their toll.

The series was retooled mid-season, including a month-long break two months after the debut and being renamed Shasta: the characters abandon the hip hop premise and remove narrative devices like breaking the fourth wall.

Cast

Main
 Jake Busey as Dennis
 Carmine Giovinazzo as Scott
 Dale Godboldo as Randy
 Jolie Jenkins as Diana

Guest stars
 Verne Troyer as Verne Valentine
 Nicole Forester as Michelle/Karen
 Erik Estrada as Eduado, Himself, Police Chief
 Wajid as Farook
 Gary Busey as Jack
 April Mills as Ren
 Kristen Winnicki as Trina
 Peter Brost as Young Dennis
Scott Caudill as Bully

Episodes

Reception
A sneak preview of the series after UPN's highly rated WWF SmackDown! drew 4.52 million viewers. However, when the series was moved to its scheduled 8 p.m. timeslot, ratings dropped. Halfway through the first season, UPN shortened the show's title to Shasta, and the series was canceled after its first season.

References

External links
 
 

1990s American sex comedy television series
1990s American single-camera sitcoms
1999 American television series debuts
2000s American sex comedy television series
2000s American single-camera sitcoms
2000 American television series endings
English-language television shows
Fictional musical groups
UPN original programming
Television shows set in Los Angeles
Television series by Sony Pictures Television